In heraldry, dimidiation is a method of marshalling (heraldically combining) two coats of arms.

For a time, dimidiation preceded the method known as impalement. Whereas impalement involves placing the whole of both coats of arms side by side in the same shield, dimidiation involves placing the dexter half of one coat of arms alongside the sinister half of the other. In the case of marriage, the dexter half of the husband's arms would be placed alongside the sinister half of the wife's arms.

The practice fell out of use because the result was not always aesthetically pleasing (sometimes creating strange hybrids), and also because in some cases, it would have resulted in a shield that confusingly looked like one coat of arms rather than a combination of two. For instance, a bend combined with a bend sinister might result in a combination that simply looked like a chevron, thus hiding the fact that two coats of arms had been combined.

In order to avoid these drawbacks, it became customary to use more than half of each coat of arms when combining them through dimidiation. Once this practice had begun, the logical progression was to include the whole of both coats of arms in the new shield, so that in effect, impalement replaced dimidiation as a method of combining coats of arms.

A general rule which carries over from dimidiation to impalement is that if a coat of arms with a bordure (or tressure, orle, etc.) is impaled, the bordure should not continue down the line of impalement.

Gallery

See also 

Division of the field
Frisian eagle

References

Sources 
Arthur Charles Fox-Davies, A Complete Guide to Heraldry (1909), pp. 182, 523-525.  Online texts at https://archive.org/details/completeguidetoh00foxduoft or http://www7b.biglobe.ne.jp/~bprince/hr/foxdavies/index.htm .

ja:マーシャリング (紋章学)

Heraldry